Malik Naseem Ahmed Aheer is Pakistani politician and former Minister of Interior of Pakistan.

Early and personal life 
Aheer was born 8 October 1936 in Khushab. His father name is Muhammad Malik Khan.

Career 
Aheer was Paksistan's Federal Minister of Communication from 1 February to 29 March 1987.

Throughout 1987, he served as the Minister of Education, Communications, Health, Special Education & Social Welfare, and Culture & Tourism, before becoming the Interior Minister from 28 July 1987 to 17 November 1988.

Aheer was also a member of the Ojhri Camp disaster investigating committee.

References 

Interior ministers of Pakistan

1936 births
Living people